Rogóźno-Zamek  is a village in the administrative district of Gmina Rogóźno, within Grudziądz County, Kuyavian-Pomeranian Voivodeship, in north-central Poland.

The village has a population of 470.

References

Castles of the Teutonic Knights
Villages in Grudziądz County